The Monticello Utah Temple is the 53rd operating temple of the Church of Jesus Christ of Latter-day Saints.

History
In October 1997, church president Gordon B. Hinckley announced the building of smaller Latter-day Saint temples throughout the world. The first of these smaller temples was to be built in Monticello, Utah. Less than one year after the announcement, the Monticello Utah Temple was dedicated on July 26, 1998.

The Monticello Utah Temple serves nearly 13,000 church members in Blanding, Moab, and Monticello, Utah areas and members from Durango, Colorado and Grand Junction, Colorado.

Located at the base of the Abajo Mountains, the temple's exterior is finished in a marble called Noah's Crème. Thirteen thousand tiles used on the temple were evaluated carefully to make sure they blended with each other for a uniform effect.

In 2020, the Monticello Utah Temple was closed in response to the coronavirus pandemic.

See also

 The Church of Jesus Christ of Latter-day Saints in Utah
 Comparison of temples of The Church of Jesus Christ of Latter-day Saints
 List of temples of The Church of Jesus Christ of Latter-day Saints
 List of temples of The Church of Jesus Christ of Latter-day Saints by geographic region
 Temple architecture (Latter-day Saints)

References

Additional reading

External links

Monticello Utah Temple Official site
Monticello Utah Temple at ChurchofJesusChristTemples.org

Religious buildings and structures completed in 1998
Buildings and structures in San Juan County, Utah
Temples (LDS Church) in Utah
20th-century Latter Day Saint temples
1998 establishments in Utah